The 1881–82 season was 
the eighth season of competitive football by Rangers.

Overview
Rangers played a total matches during the 1881–82 season.

Results
All results are written with Rangers' score first.

Scottish Cup

Appearances

See also
 1881–82 in Scottish football
 1881–82 Scottish Cup

External links
1881–82 Rangers F.C.Results

Rangers F.C. seasons
Rangers